Gobovce, is a settlement on the right bank of the Sava River in the Municipality of Naklo in the Upper Carniola region of Slovenia.

Cultural heritage
On the slope above the village (above the regional road), there is a  cave in conglomerate rock known as Gypsy Cave. It is an archaeological site. A hoard of coins from Roman times, the majority from the 4th century AD, was found in the cave in 1895.

References

External links 

Gobovce on Geopedia
Gobovce on Naklo municipal website

Populated places in the Municipality of Naklo